Peddiea kivuensis is a species of plant in the family Thymelaeaceae. It is endemic to the Democratic Republic of the Congo.  It is threatened by habitat loss.

References

Flora of the Democratic Republic of the Congo
Conservation dependent plants
Taxonomy articles created by Polbot
Thymelaeoideae